Schwarzschild is a German surname meaning "black sign" or "black shield".
Those bearing the name include:
 Karl Schwarzschild (1873–1916), physicist and astronomer
 Steven Schwarzschild (1924–1989), philosopher and rabbi
 Henry Schwarzschild (1926–1996), civil rights activist
 Martin Schwarzschild (1912–1997), astronomer 
 Shimon Schwarzschild (1925–), environmental activist
 Luise Hercus (née Schwarzschild) (1926–), linguist
 Leopold_Schwarzschild (Leopold Schwarzschild), author and philosopher

See also 
 Rothschild

Footnotes 

Jewish surnames
Yiddish-language surnames